Blackthorn Peak, also known as Black Thorn, is a 4,117 foot (1,255 meter) mountain summit located at the head of Glacier Bay's Geikie Inlet in Glacier Bay National Park and Preserve, in the Fairweather Range of the Saint Elias Mountains, in southeast Alaska. Although modest in elevation, relief is significant since the mountain rises up from tidewater in a little over two miles. The mountain was given its descriptive name in 1896 by Harry Fielding Reid, an American geophysicist who studied glaciology in Glacier Bay. Weather permitting, Blackthorn Peak can be seen from Glacier Bay, which is a popular destination for cruise ships. The months May through June offer the most favorable weather for viewing or climbing the peak.

Climate

Based on the Köppen climate classification, Blackthorn Peak is located in a subpolar oceanic climate zone, with long, cold, snowy winters, and cool summers. Weather systems coming off the Gulf of Alaska are forced upwards by the Saint Elias Mountains (orographic lift), causing heavy precipitation in the form of rainfall and snowfall. Temperatures can drop below −20 °C with wind chill factors below −30 °C. Precipitation runoff from the mountain drains into Glacier Bay Basin.

See also
List of mountain peaks of Alaska
Geography of Alaska

References

External links
 Weather forecast: Blackthorn Peak

Mountains of Glacier Bay National Park and Preserve
Saint Elias Mountains
Landforms of Hoonah–Angoon Census Area, Alaska
Mountains of Alaska
North American 1000 m summits